

Events

January 

 January 3 – First Balkan War: Greece completes its capture of the eastern Aegean island of Chios, as the last Ottoman forces on the island surrender.
 January 13 – Edward Carson founds the (first) Ulster Volunteer Force, by unifying several existing loyalist militias to resist home rule for Ireland.
 January 18 – First Balkan War: Battle of Lemnos – Greek admiral Pavlos Kountouriotis forces the Turkish fleet to retreat to its base within the Dardanelles, from which it will not venture for the rest of the war.
 January 23 – 1913 Ottoman coup d'état: Ismail Enver comes to power.

February 

 February 1 – New York City's Grand Central Terminal, having been rebuilt, reopens as the world's largest railroad station.
 February 3 – The 16th Amendment to the United States Constitution is ratified, authorizing the Federal government to impose and collect income taxes on all sources of income, not just some.
 February 9 – Mexican Revolution: "La Decena Trágica", the rebellion of some military chiefs against the President Francisco I. Madero, begins.
 February 13 – Thubten Gyatso, the 13th Dalai Lama, declares the independence of Tibet from Qing dynasty China.
 February 18 – Mexican Revolution: President Francisco I. Madero and Vice President José María Pino Suárez are forced to resign. Pedro Lascuráin serves as president for less than an hour, before General Victoriano Huerta, leader of the coup, takes office.
 February 22 – Mexican Revolution: Francisco I. Madero and José María Pino Suárez are assassinated.
 February 23 – Joseph Stalin is arrested by the Russian secret police, the Okhrana, in Petrograd, and exiled to Siberia.

March 

 March
 The House of Romanov celebrates the 300th anniversary of its succession to the throne, amidst an outpouring of monarchist sentiment in Russia.
 Following the assassination of his rival Song Jiaoren, Yuan Shikai uses military force to dissolve China's parliament, and rules as a dictator.
 c. March 1 – British steamship Calvados disappears in the Sea of Marmara, with 200 on board.
 March 3 – The Woman Suffrage Procession takes place in Washington, D.C. led by Inez Milholland on horseback.
 March 4
 Woodrow Wilson is sworn in, as the 28th President of the United States.
 The U.S. Department of Commerce and U.S. Department of Labor are established, by splitting the duties of the 10-year-old Department of Commerce and Labor. The Census Bureau, U.S. Bureau of Fisheries and U.S. Coast and Geodetic Survey form part of the Department of Commerce.
 March 4–6 – First Balkan War – Battle of Bizani: Forces of the Kingdom of Greece capture the forts of Bizani (covering the approaches to Ioannina) from the Ottoman Empire.
 March 7 – British freighter Alum Chine, carrying 343 tons of dynamite, explodes in Baltimore harbour.
 March 13 – Mexican Revolution: Pancho Villa returns to Mexico, from his self-imposed exile in the United States.
 March 17 – The Military Aviation Academy (Escuela de Aviación Militar) is founded in Uruguay, to become the Military Air Force (Fuerza Aérea Militar) on 4 December 1952 (the Uruguayan Air Force (FAU) will grow from this foundation).
 March 18 – King George I of Greece is assassinated after 50 years on the throne; he is succeeded by his son Constantine I.
 March 20 – Sung Chiao-jen, a founder of the Chinese nationalist party (Kuomintang), is wounded in an assassination attempt, and dies two days later.
 The city of Canberra, the center of the Australian Capital Territory, becomes the official capital of the Commonwealth of Australia.
 March 23 – Supporters of Phan Xích Long begin a revolt against colonial rule in French Indochina.
 March 25 – The Great Dayton Flood, after four days of rain in the Miami Valley, kills over 360 and destroys 20,000 homes (chiefly in Dayton, Ohio).
March 26
 Mexican Revolution: Venustiano Carranza announces his Plan of Guadalupe, and begins his rebellion against Victoriano Huerta's government, as head of the Constitutionals.
 Balkan Wars: The Siege of Adrianople ends, when Bulgarian forces take Adrianople from the Ottomans.

April 

 April – Bernhard Kellermann's novel Der Tunnel is published.
 April 5 – The United States Soccer Federation is formed.
 April 8 – The Seventeenth Amendment to the United States Constitution is passed, dictating the direct election of senators.
 April 21 – Cunard ocean liner , built by John Brown & Company, is launched on the River Clyde.
 April 24 – The Woolworth Building opens in New York City. Designed by Cass Gilbert, it is the tallest building in the world on this date, and for more than a decade after.

May 

 May 3 – Raja Harishchandra, the first full-length Indian feature film, is released, marking the beginning of the Indian film industry.
 May 9–July 11 – A major industrial strike occurs in the Black Country of England, involving 25,000 workers, and threatening preparations for World War I in naval and steel industries. The workers demand 23 shillings minimum wage.
 May 14 – New York Governor William Sulzer approves the charter for the Rockefeller Foundation, which begins operations with a $100,000,000 donation from John D. Rockefeller.
 May 24–25 – Adolf Hitler moves from Vienna to Munich.
 May 24 – Princess Victoria Louise of Prussia marries Prince Ernest Augustus of Hanover in Berlin, ending the decades-long rift between the Houses of Hohenzollern and Hanover and marking the last great gathering of European sovereigns.
 May 26 (May 13 O.S.) – Igor Sikorsky becomes the first person to pilot a 4-engine fixed-wing aircraft.
 May 29 – The ballet The Rite of Spring (music by Igor Stravinsky, conducted by Pierre Monteux, choreography by Vaslav Nijinsky and design by Nicholas Roerich) is premiered by Sergei Diaghilev's Ballets Russes, at the Théâtre des Champs-Élysées in Paris; its modernist style provokes one of the most famous classical music riots in history. The audience includes Gabriele D'Annunzio, Coco Chanel, Marcel Duchamp, Harry Graf Kessler and Maurice Ravel.
 May 30 – First Balkan War: The Treaty of London is signed, ending the war. Greece is granted those parts of southern Epirus which it does not already control, and the independence of Albania is recognised.

June 

 June 1 – The Greek–Serbian Treaty of Alliance is signed, paving the way for the Second Balkan War.
 June 4 – Emily Davison, a British suffragette, runs out in front of the King's horse, Anmer, at The Derby. She is trampled and dies four days later in hospital, never having regained consciousness.
 June 8 – The Deutsches Stadion in Berlin is dedicated with the release of 10,000 pigeons, in front of an audience of 60,000 people. It had been constructed in anticipation of the 1916 Summer Olympics (later to be cancelled as the result of World War I).
 June 11 
 Women's suffrage is enacted in Norway.
 Battle of Bud Bagsak: Armed with guns and heavy artillery, U.S. and Philippine troops under General John J. "Black Jack" Pershing fight a four-day battle against 500 Moro rebels, who are armed mostly with kampilan swords. The rebels are killed in a final desperate charge on June 15.
 June 18 – The Arab Congress of 1913 opens, during which Arab nationalists meet to discuss desired reforms under the Ottoman Empire.
 June 19 – The Parliament of South Africa passes the Natives Land Act, limiting land ownership for blacks to black territories.
 June 13 – The predecessor of the Aldi store chain opens in Essen, Germany.
 June 24 – Joseph Cook becomes the 6th Prime Minister of Australia.
 June 29 – The Second Balkan War begins.

July 

 July 10
 Romania declares war on Bulgaria.
 July 13 – The 1913 Romanian Army cholera outbreak during the Second Balkan War starts.
 July 27 – The town of San Javier, Uruguay, is founded by Russian settlers.

August 

 August 2 – The first known ascent of Mount Olympus in Greece is made by Swiss mountaineers Daniel Baud-Bovy and Frédéric Boissonnas guided by Christos Kakkalos.
 August 4 – Republic of China: The province of Chungking (Chongqing) declares independence; Republican forces crush the rebellion in a couple of weeks.
 August 10 – Second Balkan War: The Treaty of Bucharest is signed, ending the war. Macedonia is divided, and Northern Epirus is assigned to Albania.
 August 13 – Harry Brearley invents stainless steel in Sheffield.
 August 23 – The Little Mermaid statue is finished in Copenhagen, Denmark.
 August 26 – Dublin Lock-out in Ireland: Members of James Larkin's Irish Transport and General Workers' Union employed by the Dublin United Tramways Company begin strike action in defiance of the dismissal of trade union members by its chairman.
 August 31 – Dublin Lock-out: "Bloody Sunday": The dispute escalates when the Dublin Metropolitan Police kill one demonstrator and injure 400, in dispersing a demonstration.

September 

 September 7–8 – The Fourth Congress of the International Psychoanalytical Association (the last occasion on which Carl Jung and Sigmund Freud will meet) takes place in Munich.
 September 9
 In Germany, BASF starts the world's first plant for the production of fertilizer based on the Haber-Bosch process, feeding in modern times about a third of the world's population.
 Imperial Russian Army pilot Pyotr Nesterov becomes the first person to loop an airplane, flying a Nieuport IV monoplane over Syretzk Aerodrome near Kiev, Russia.
 Helgoland Island air disaster: The first fatalities aboard a German airship occur, when the Imperial German Navy Zeppelin dirigible LZ 14 (naval designation L 1) is forced down into the North Sea off Heligoland during a thunderstorm, killing 16 of the 22 men on board.
 September 10 – Jean Sibelius's tone poem Luonnotar is premiered in Gloucester Cathedral, England, with soprano Aino Ackté.
 September 17 – In Chicago, the Anti-Defamation League of B'nai B'rith is founded, with Sigmund Livingston as its first president.
 September 23 – French aviator Roland Garros crosses the Mediterranean in an airplane flying from Fréjus, France to Bizerte, Tunisia.
 September 29 – Second Balkan War: The Treaty of Constantinople is signed in Istanbul, between the Ottoman Empire and the Kingdom of Bulgaria.

October 

 October 1 – Mexican Revolution: Pancho Villa's troops take Torreón after a 3-day battle, when government troops retreat.

 October 7 – The Ford Motor Company's Highland Park Plant in Highland Park, Michigan, near Detroit, becomes the first automobile production facility in the world to implement the moving assembly line, significantly speeding up production of the Model T.
 October 9 – Canadian-owned ocean liner , carrying passengers (mostly immigrants) and a chemical cargo from Rotterdam to New York City, catches fire in a North Atlantic gale; 136 die, but 521 are saved by ships summoned by SOS messages to the scene.
 October 10
 U.S. President Woodrow Wilson triggers the explosion of the Gamboa Dike, ending construction on the Panama Canal.
 Yuan Shikai is elected President of the Republic of China.
 October 11 – The Philadelphia Athletics win the deciding game of the 1913 World Series, over baseball's New York Giants, winning 3–1 to take the series in five games.
 October 14 – Senghenydd colliery disaster: An explosion at the Universal Colliery, Senghenydd in South Wales kills 439 miners, the worst mining accident in the United Kingdom.
 October 16 – The British Royal Navy's  is launched at Portsmouth Dockyard as the first oil-fired battleship.

 October 18 – The Monument to the Battle of the Nations at Leipzig, Germany is finished.
 October 19 – The DLRG (German Life-Saving Society) is founded.
 October 26 – Victoriano Huerta elected president of Mexico.
 October 28–December 2 – Zabern Affair: Acts of aggression by the Prussian garrison at Zabern, Alsace-Lorraine provoke political debate across the German Empire.
 October 31 – The Lincoln Highway, the first automobile road across the United States, is dedicated.

November 

 November 5 – King Otto of Bavaria is deposed by his cousin, Prince Regent Ludwig, who assumes the title Ludwig III.
 November 6 – Mohandas Gandhi is arrested, while leading a march of Indian miners in South Africa.
 November 7–11 – The Great Lakes Storm of 1913 claims 19 ships, and more than 250 lives.

December 

 December 1
 The Ford Motor Company introduces the first moving assembly line, reducing chassis assembly time from  hours in October to 2 hours, 40 minutes. Although Ford is not the first to use an assembly line, his successful adoption of one sparks an era of mass production.
 Crete, having obtained self rule from Turkey after the First Balkan War, is annexed by Greece.
Buenos Aires Underground, the first in South America, opens.
 December 12 – Vincenzo Peruggia tries to sell the Mona Lisa in Florence, and is arrested.
 December 19 – The Raker Act is signed by President Woodrow Wilson, allowing the City of San Francisco to dam Hetch Hetchy Valley in Yosemite National Park.
 December 23 – The Federal Reserve System is created as the central banking system of the United States, by Woodrow Wilson's signature of the Federal Reserve Act.
 December 30 – Italy returns the Mona Lisa to France.

Date unknown 
 The Ahmadiyya Muslim Community is established in Bengal Province (modern-day Bangladesh).
 French physicist Georges Sagnac shows that light propagates at a speed independent of the speed of its source.
 The Camel cigarettes are introduced by R. J. Reynolds in the United States (the first packaged cigarettes).
 Prada is established as a leather goods dealer in Milan, by Mario Prada and his brother.
 Astra, as predecessor of AstraZeneca, a healthcare and pharmaceutical brand worldwide, founded in Södertälje, Sweden. 
 The value of world trade reaches roughly $38 billion.

Births

January–February

 January 1 – Shek Kin, Hong Kong actor (d. 2009)
 January 2 – Anna Lee, English-American actress (d. 2004)
 January 4 – Malietoa Tanumafili II, Samoan head of state (d. 2007)
 January 6
 Edward Gierek, Polish politician (d. 2001)
 Loretta Young, American actress (d. 2000)
 January 9
 Eric Berry, British actor (d. 1993)
 Richard Nixon, 37th President of the United States (d. 1994)
 January 10
 Gustáv Husák, Slovak politician (d. 1991)
 Mehmet Shehu, 23rd Prime Minister of Albania (d. 1981)
 January 11 – Karl Stegger, Danish actor (d. 1980)
 January 15
 Eugène Brands, Dutch painter (d. 2002)
 Lloyd Bridges, American actor (d. 1998)
 Alexander Marinesko, Soviet naval officer (d. 1963)
 January 22
 Henry Bauchau, Belgian novelist, poet and psychoanalyst (d. 2012)
 William Conway, Irish cardinal (d. 1977)
 Carl F. H. Henry, American theologian and publisher (d. 2003)
 January 23 – Jean-Michel Atlan, French painter (d. 1960)
 January 25
 Huang Hua, Foreign Minister of China (d. 2010)
 Witold Lutosławski, Polish composer (d. 1994)
 January 29 – Victor Mature, American actor (d. 1999)
 February 2 – Poul Reichhardt, Danish actor (d. 1985)
 February 4 – Rosa Parks, American civil rights activist (d. 2005)
 February 6 – Mary Leakey, British anthropologist (d. 1996)
 February 8 – Betty Field, American actress (d. 1973)
 February 10
 Douglas Slocombe, British cinematographer (d. 2016)
 Bill White, Australian rugby union player (d. 1969)
 February 14 – Jimmy Hoffa, American labor leader (disappeared 1975)
 February 19 – Frank Tashlin, American animation director (d. 1972)
 February 23 – P. C. Sorcar, Indian stage magician (d. 1971)
 February 25
 Jim Backus, American actor (d. 1989)
 Gert Fröbe, German actor (Goldfinger) (d. 1988)
 February 27
 Paul Ricœur, French philosopher (d. 2005)
 Kazimierz Sabbat, leader of Polish government-in-exile (d. 1989)
 Irwin Shaw, American writer (d. 1984)

March–April 

 March 2 – Godfried Bomans, Dutch writer (d. 1971)
 March 4 – John Garfield, American actor (d. 1952)
 March 13
 William J. Casey, American Central Intelligence Agency director (d. 1987)
 Sergey Mikhalkov, Russian writer, lyricist (d. 2009)
 March 15 – Rosita Contreras, Argentine actress (d. 1962)
 March 18
 René Clément, French film director (d. 1996)
 Reinhard Hardegen, German U-boat commander (d. 2018)
 Werner Mölders, German fighter pilot (d. 1941)
 March 19 – Smoky Dawson, Australian singer (d. 2008)
 March 26
 Paul Erdős, Hungarian mathematician (d. 1996)
 Jacqueline de Romilly, French philologist (d. 2010)
 March 29 – R. S. Thomas, Welsh poet (d. 2000)
 March 30
 Richard Helms, American Central Intelligence Agency director (d. 2002)
 Frankie Laine, American singer (d. 2007)
 Ċensu Tabone, Maltese politician (d. 2012)
 March 31 – Etta Baker, American musician (d. 2006)
 April 3 – Per Borten, Premier of Norway (d. 2005)
 April 4 
 Frances Langford, American singer, actress (d. 2005)
 Muddy Waters, African-American musician (d. 1983)
 April 7 – Louise Currie, American actress (d. 2013)
 April 8
 Sourou-Migan Apithy, Beninese political figure, 2nd President of Dahomey (d. 1989)
 Carlton Skinner, Governor of Guam (d. 2004)
 April 9 – Aleksanteri Saarvala, Finnish artistic gymnast (d. 1989)
 April 10 – Stefan Heym, German writer (d. 2001)
 April 11 – Oleg Cassini, American fashion designer (d. 2006)
 April 11 – Winifred Drinkwater, Scottish aviator, first woman to hold a commercial pilot's license (d. 1996)
 April 14 – Jean Fournet, French conductor (d. 2008)
 April 16 – Les Tremayne, British-born American actor (d. 2003)
 April 18 – Jack Pope, American judge, attorney, and author (d. 2017)
 April 19 
 Lloyd Cardwell, American football player and coach (d. 1997)
 Karl Rawer, German physicist (d. 2018)
 April 21 – Richard Beeching, chairman of British Rail (d. 1985)
 April 27 – Philip Hauge Abelson, American physicist, writer, and editor (d. 2004)
 April 29 – Eugene Vielle, British Royal Air Force officer (d. 2015)

May–June 

 May 1
 Roy Matsumoto, American army officer (d. 2014)
 Louis Nye, American comedian, actor (d. 2005)
 Walter Susskind, Czech conductor (d. 1980)
 May 4 – Hisaya Morishige, Japanese actor (d. 2009)
 May 5 – Fred J. Doocy, American politician, banker (d. 2017)
 May 6 – Stewart Granger, Anglo-American actor (d. 1993)
 May 8
 Bob Clampett, American director (Looney Tunes) (d. 1984)
 Saima Harmaja, Finnish poet (d. 1937)
 Sid James, South African-born British actor, comedian (d. 1976)
 Charles Scorsese, American actor, father of Martin Scorsese (d. 1993)
 May 11 – Robert Jungk, Austrian journalist (d. 1994)
 May 13 – William Tolbert, President of Liberia (d. 1980)
 May 16 – Woody Herman, American musician, band leader (d. 1987)
 May 19 – Neelam Sanjiva Reddy, Indian politician, 6th President of India (d. 1996)
 May 20 
 Teodoro Fernández, Peruvian soccer player (d. 1996)
 William Hewlett, American businessman (d. 2001)
 May 22 – Benedict Garmisa, American politician (d. 1985)
 May 24 – Haldpr Topsøe, Danish engineer (d. 2013)
 May 26
 Peter Cushing, English actor (d. 1994)
 Pierre Daninos, French writer, humorist (d. 2005)
 Josef Manger, German weightlifter (d. 1991)
 May 29 – Tony Zale, American boxer (d. 1997)
 May 31 – Peter Frankenfeld, German comedian, radio and television personality (d. 1979)
 June 2 – Elsie Tu, English-born Hong Kong social activist (d. 2015)
 June 3 – Yitzhak Berman, Israeli politician (d. 2013)
 June 10 – Benjamin Shapira, German-born Israeli biochemist, recipient of the Israel Prize (d. 1993)
 June 11
 Vince Lombardi, American football coach (d. 1970)
 Risë Stevens, American mezzo-soprano (d. 2013)
 June 13
 Ralph Edwards, American game show host (d. 2005)
 Yitzhak Pundak, Polish-born Israeli military officer, diplomat (d. 2017)
 Oswald Teichmüller, German mathematician (d. 1943)
 June 18
 Robert Mondavi, American winemaker (d. 2008)
 Sammy Cahn, American songwriter (d. 1993)
 Sylvia Field Porter, American economist, journalist (d. 1991)
 June 21
 Luis Taruc, Filipino political figure, insurgent (d. 2005)
 Madihe Pannaseeha Thero, Sri Lankan Buddhist monk (d. 2003)
 Kid Azteca, Mexican boxer (d. 2002)
 June 22 – Álvaro Alsogaray, Argentine politician and businessman (d. 2005)
 June 23
 Jacques Rabemananjara, Malagasy politician, playwright and poet (d. 2005)
 William P. Rogers, American diplomat (d. 2001)
 June 24 – Gustaaf Deloor, Belgian road racing cyclist (d. 2002)
 June 26
 Aimé Césaire, French Martinican poet, politician (d. 2008)
 Konrāds Kalējs, Latvian soldier (d. 2001)
 Anissa Rawda Najjar, Lebanese feminist, women's rights activist (d. 2016)
 Maurice Wilkes, British computer scientist (d. 2010)
 June 28 
 Franz Antel, Austrian filmmaker (d. 2007)
 Maldwyn James, Welsh international rugby union player (d. 2003)
 June 30 
 Henry Leask, British Army officer (d. 2004)
 Alfonso López Michelsen, 24th President of Colombia (d. 2007)

July 

 July 1 
 Noel Miller, Australian cricketer (d. 2007)
 André Tollet, French upholsterer, trade unionist and communist (d. 2001)
 Mario Acerbi, Italian football player (d. 2010)
 Joana Raspall i Juanola, Spanish writer and librarian (d. 2013)
 Paramasiva Prabhakar Kumaramangalam, Indian Army Chief (d. 2000)
 July 3 – Dorothy Kilgallen, American newspaper columnist (d. 1965)
 July 4 – Barbara Weeks, American actress (d. 2003)
 July 5 – Elwood Cooke, American tennis player (d. 2004)
 July 6 – Vance Trimble, American Pulitzer Prize-winning journalist, author (d. 2021)
 July 7 – Pinetop Perkins, American blues musician (d. 2011)
 July 8 – Alejandra Soler, Spanish politician and schoolteacher (d. 2017)
 July 9 
 Ted Grant, South African Trotskyist (d. 2006)
 William M. Zachacki, (d. 1969)
 July 10 – Joan Marsh, American actress (d. 2000)
 July 11 – Kofi Abrefa Busia, Ghanaian nationalist leader, 2nd Prime Minister of Ghana (d. 1978)
 July 12
 Sultan Hamid II (d. 1978)
 Rufus Rogers, New Zealand doctor, politician (d. 2009)
 Willis Lamb, American physicist, Nobel Prize laureate (d. 2008)
 July 13 – Mærsk Mc-Kinney Møller, Danish shipping magnate (d. 2012)
 July 14
 Gerald Ford, 38th President of the United States (d. 2006)
 René Llense, French football goalkeeper (d. 2014)
 July 15
 Hammond Innes, English author (d. 1998)
 Abraham Sutzkever, Yiddish language poet, memoirist (d. 2010)
 July 16 
 Mirza Babayev, Azerbaijani movie actor, singer (d. 2003)
 Antoine Raab, German footballer (d. 2006)
 Carmen Acevedo Vega, Ecuadorian poet, writer, and journalist (d. 2006)
 July 18
 N. Krishnaswami Reddy, Indian lawyer (d. 2002)
 Du Runsheng, Chinese military officer, politician, and economist (d. 2015)
 Red Skelton, American comedian (d. 1997)
 July 19 – Manouchehr Sotodeh, Iranian geographer (d. 2016)
 July 20 
 Irma Córdoba, Argentine actress (d. 2008)
 Guillermo Leaden, Argentine bishop (d. 2014)
 July 22
 Esteban Reyes, Mexican tennis player (d. 2014)
 Gorni Kramer, Italian bandleader, songwriter (d. 1995)
 Licia Albanese, Italian-born soprano (d. 2014)
 July 23
 Coral Browne, Australian actress (d. 1991)
 Michael Foot, British politician (d. 2010)
 July 26 – Kan Yuet-keung, Hong Kong banker, politician and lawyer (d. 2012)
 July 29 – Erich Priebke, German war criminal, leader of the 1944 Ardeatine massacre (d. 2013)

August 

 August 9 – Tadeusz Kotz, Polish World War II fighter ace (d. 2008)
 August 10 
 Noah Beery Jr., American actor (d. 1994)
 Wolfgang Paul, German physicist (d. 1993)
 August 13
 Fred Davis, English snooker and billiards player (d. 1998)
 Makarios III, Archbishop and first President of Cyprus (d. 1977)
 August 16
 Menachem Begin, 6th Prime Minister of Israel, recipient of the Nobel Peace Prize (d. 1992)
 August 18 – Nils Löfgren, Swedish chemist (d. 1967)
 August 20 – Roger Wolcott Sperry, American neurobiologist, recipient of the Nobel Prize in Physiology or Medicine (d. 1994)
 August 22 – James W. Downing, American naval officer and author (d. 2018)
 August 26 – Boris Pahor, Slovenian writer (d. 2022)
 August 27 – Nina Schenk Gräfin von Stauffenberg, German wife of freedom fighter Claus Schenk von Stauffenberg (d. 2006)
 August 28
 Robertson Davies, Canadian novelist (d. 1995)
 Richard Tucker, American tenor (d. 1975)
 August 29 – Jan Ekier, Polish pianist, composer (d. 2014)
 August 30 – Richard Stone, British economist, Nobel Prize laureate (d. 1991)
 August 31
 Helen Levitt, American photographer (d. 2009)
 Bernard Lovell, British radio astronomer (d. 2012)

September–October 

 September 1 – Ludwig Merwart, Austrian painter, graphic artist (d. 1979)
 September 2
 Israel Gelfand, Russian mathematician (d. 2009)
 Bill Shankly, Scottish football manager (d. 1981)
 September 3 – Alan Ladd, American actor (d. 1964)
 September 4
 Stanford Moore, American chemist, Nobel Prize laureate (d. 1982)
 Kenzō Tange, Japanese architect (d. 2005)
 September 6 – Julie Gibson, American singer and actress (d. 2019)
 September 10 – Zephania Mothopeng, South African politician, activist (d. 1990)
 September 11 – Paul "Bear" Bryant, American football coach (d. 1983)
 September 12
 Jesse Owens, African-American athlete (d. 1980)
 Eiji Toyoda, Japanese industrialist (d. 2013)
 September 13 – Trần Đại Nghĩa, North Vietnamese army general (d. 1997)
 September 14
 Jacobo Árbenz, President of Guatemala (d. 1971)
 Annalisa Ericson, Swedish actress (d. 2011)
 September 15 – John N. Mitchell, United States Attorney General, convicted Watergate criminal (d. 1988)
 September 17 
 Robert Lembke, German television presenter, game show host (d. 1989)
 Ata Kandó, Hungarian-born Dutch photographer (d. 2017)
 September 19 – Frances Farmer, American actress (d. 1970)
 September 22 – Lillian Chestney, American painter (d. 2000)
 September 23 – Carl-Henning Pedersen, Danish artist, member of the CoBrA movement (d. 2007)
 September 24
 Wilson Rawls, American author (d. 1984)
 Herb Jeffries, American actor, popular music and jazz singer (d. 2014)
 September 25
 Charles Helou, 9th President of Lebanon (d. 2001)
 Terence Patrick O'Sullivan, British civil engineer (d. 1970)
 September 27 – Alexandru Drăghici, Romanian communist activist and politician (d. 1993)
 September 28 – Warja Honegger-Lavater, Swiss artist, illustrator (d. 2007)
 September 29
 Trevor Howard, English actor (d. 1988)
 Stanley Kramer, American film producer, director, and writer (d. 2001)
 Silvio Piola, Italian footballer (d. 1996)
 September 30 
 Bill Walsh, American movie producer, writer (d. 1975)
 Cecilia Caballero Blanco, First Lady of Colombia (d. 2019)
 October 2 – Roma Mitchell, Australian lawyer, Governor of South Australia (d. 2000)
 October 4 – Martial Célestin, 1st Prime Minister of Haiti (d. 2011)
 October 10
 Alice Chetwynd Ley, British romance writer (d. 2004)
 Claude Simon, French writer, Nobel Prize laureate (d. 2005)
 October 11 – Joe Simon, American comic book artist, writer (d. 2011)
 October 18 – Evelyn Venable, American actress (d. 1993)
 October 19 – Vinicius de Moraes, Brazilian poet, lyricist, and diplomat (d. 1980)
 October 20
 Barney Phillips, American actor (d. 1982)
 Cecilia Miranda de Carvalho, Brazilian singer (d. 2011)
 October 22
 Boots Mallory, American actress, dancer, and model (d. 1958)
 Robert Capa, Hungarian-born American photojournalist (d. 1954)
 Tamara Desni, German-born British actress (d. 2008)
 Hans-Peter Tschudi, 2-time President of Switzerland (d. 2002)
 October 24
 Ron Barassi Sr., Australian rules footballer (d. 1941)
 Tito Gobbi, Italian operatic baritone (d. 1984)
 October 27
 Joe Medicine Crow, American tribal historian and anthropologist (d. 2016)
 Otto Wichterle, Czech inventor of the modern contact lens (d. 1998)
 October 28 – Don Lusk, American animator (d. 2018)

November 

 November 2 – Burt Lancaster, American actor, best known for his role in Elmer Gantry (d. 1994)
 November 3 
 Marika Rökk, Egyptian-born Austrian singer, dancer and actress (d. 2004)
 Antony Mitradas, Indian film director (d. 2017)
 November 5 – Vivien Leigh, British actress (d. 1967)
 November 7
 Albert Camus, French writer, Nobel Prize laureate (d. 1960)
 Elizabeth Bradford Holbrook, Canadian sculptor (d. 2009)
 Tahira Tahirova, Azerbaijani politician (d. 1991)
 November 8 – Max Desfor, American photographer (d. 2018)
 November 10
 Álvaro Cunhal, Portuguese politician (d. 2005)
 Sun Yun-suan, Chinese engineer, politician (d. 2006)
 November 11 – Rosemary Inyama, educator, politician, businesswoman and community developer (d. unknown)
 November 13 – Lon Nol, 2-Time Prime Minister of Cambodia (d. 1985)
 November 15 – Arthur Haulot, Belgian journalist (d. 2005)
 November 16 – Ellen Albertini Dow, American actress (d. 2015)
 November 18 – Endre Rozsda, Hungarian-French painter (d. 1999)
 November 21
 John Boulting, English film director (d. 1985)
 Roy Boulting, English film director, producer (d. 2001)
 November 22
 Charles Berlitz, American author (d. 2003)
 Benjamin Britten, English composer (d. 1976)
 Gardnar Mulloy, American tennis player and coach (d. 2016)
 Cecilia Muñoz-Palma, first female Philippine Supreme Court Justice (d. 2006)
 Jacqueline Vaudecrane, French figure skater (d. 2018)
 November 25 – Lewis Thomas, American physician, essayist (d. 1993)

December 

 December 1 – Mary Martin, American actress (d. 1990)
 December 6
 Nikolai Amosov, Ukrainian heart surgeon, inventor, best-selling author, and exercise enthusiast (d. 2002)
 Eleanor Holm, American swimmer (d. 2004)
 December 9 – Cynthia Chalk, American photographer (d. 2018)
 December 10 – Morton Gould, American composer (d. 1996)
 December 11 – Jean Marais, French actor (d. 1998)
 December 13 – Susanne Suba, Hungarian-born watercolorist and illustrator, active in the United States (d. 2012)
 December 16 – George Ignatieff, Canadian diplomat, recipient of the 1984 Pearson Medal of Peace (d. 1989)
 December 18
 Lynn Bari, American actress (d. 1989)
 Alfred Bester, American author (d. 1987)
 Willy Brandt, Chancellor of Germany, recipient of the Nobel Peace Prize (d. 1992)
 December 21 – Arnold Friberg, American artist (d. 2010)
 December 23 – Frank Pierpoint Appleby, Canadian politician (d. 2015)
 December 25 
 Tony Martin, American singer and actor (d. 2012)
 Henri Nannen, German journalist, mass media owner (d. 1996)
 December 26 – Frank Swift, English footballer (d. 1958)
 December 28 – Lou Jacobi, Canadian-American actor (d. 2009)
 December 29 – Pierre Werner, Prime Minister of Luxembourg (d. 2002)
 December 30 – Elyne Mitchell, Australian author (d. 2002)

Date unknown 
 Halil-Salim Jabara, Israeli Arab politician (d. 1999)
 Bahjat Talhouni, 4-time Prime Minister of Jordan (d. 1994)

Deaths

January 
 January 2
 Hermann Kinkelin, Swiss mathematician and politician (b. 1832)
 Léon Teisserenc de Bort, French meteorologist (b. 1855)
 January 3 – Jeff Davis, American politician, 20th Governor of Arkansas (b. 1862)
 January 4 – Alfred von Schlieffen, German field marshal (b. 1833)
 January 6 – Gyula Juhász, Hungarian sculptor (b. 1876)
January 8 - Xavier Mertz, Swiss explorer, mountaineer and skier (b. 1882)
 January 16
 Tom Dolan, American baseball pitcher (b. 1855)
 Thaddeus S. C. Lowe, American aeronaut, scientist and inventor (b. 1832)
 January 18 – George Alexander Gibson, Scottish physician (b. 1854)
 January 20
 José Guadalupe Posada, Mexican political printmaker and engraver (b. 1852)
 Karl Wittgenstein, Austrian steel tycoon (b. 1847)
 January 21 – Aluísio Azevedo, Brazilian novelist (b. 1857)
 January 27 – Archduke Rainer Ferdinand of Austria (b. 1832)
 January 28
 Julius Heinrich Franz, German astronomer (b. 1847)
 Segismundo Moret, Spanish politician and writer, 3-time Prime Minister of Spain (b. 1833)

February 

 February 2 – Gustaf de Laval, Swedish engineer and inventor (b. 1845)
 February 5 
 Johan Ehrnrooth, 5th Prime Minister of Bulgaria (b. 1833)
 Lio Gangeri, Italian sculptor (b. 1845)
 February 8 – Morten Eskesen, Danish author (b. 1826)
 February 9 – Manuel Enrique Araujo, 23rd President of El Salvador (assassinated) (b. 1865)
 February 15 – Florence Barker, American actress (b. 1891)
 February 17 – Edward Stanley Gibbons, English philatelist, founder of Stanley Gibbons Ltd (b. 1840)
 February 20 – Robert von Lieben, Austrian physicist (b. 1878)
 February 22 
 Ferdinand de Saussure, Swiss linguist and semiotician (b. 1857)
 Empress Dowager Longyu, Chinese empress (b. 1868)
 Francisco I. Madero, 33rd President of Mexico, assassinated (b. 1873)
 February 23 – Dénes Andrássy, Hungarian nobleman (b. 1835)
 February 26 – Felix Draeseke, German composer (b. 1835)
 February 28 – George Finnegan, American Olympic boxer (b. 1881)

March 

 March 7 – E. Pauline Johnson, Canadian writer (b. 1861)
 March 10 – Harriet Tubman, American abolitionist, humanitarian and spy (b. c. 1822)
 March 11 – John Shaw Billings, American military, medical leader (b. 1838)
 March 12 – Francisco Pereira Passos, Brazilian engineer politician, Mayor of Rio de Janeiro (b. 1836)
 March 13 – Felix Hidalgo, Filipino artist (b. 1855)
 March 14 – Auguste Desgodins, French missionary (b. 1826)
 March 17 – Soledad Acosta, Colombian journalist and writer (b. 1833)
 March 18 – King George I of Greece (b. 1845)
 March 19 – Géza Allaga, Hungarian composer (b. 1841)
 March 21 – Manuel Bonilla, 2-time President of Honduras (b. 1849)
 March 22
Gheorghe Grigore Cantacuzino, Romanian lawyer and politician, 20th Prime Minister of Romania (b. 1833)
Sung Chiao-jen, Chinese revolutionary (b. 1882)
 March 25 – Garnet Wolseley, 1st Viscount Wolseley, British field marshal (b. 1833)
 March 31 – J. P. Morgan, American financier (b. 1837)

April 
 April 7 – Carl von Lemcke, German mathematician (b. 1867)
 April 8 – Gyula Kőnig, Hungarian mathematician (b. 1849)
 April 15 – Kareemullah Shah, Indian Sufi scholar and saint
 April 18 – Lester Frank Ward, American botanist, paleontologist and sociologist (b. 1841)
 April 19
 Paul Janson, Belgian politician (b. 1840)
 Hugo Winckler, German archaeologist and historian who uncovered the capital of the Hittite Empire (Hattusa) (b. 1863)
 April 20 – Vilhelm Bissen, Danish sculptor (b. 1836)
 April 24 – Vsevolod Abramovich, Russian aviator (b. 1890)
 April 25 
 Mykhailo Kotsiubynsky, Ukrainian author (b. 1864)
 Stjepan Kovačević, Croatian politician (b. 1841)
 April 27 – Gabriel von Seidl, German architect (b. 1848)
 April 28 – Andreas Flocken, German entrepreneur and inventor (b. 1845)
 April 29 – Václav Hladík, Austro-Hungarian novelist (b. 1868)

May 

 May 1 – John Barclay Armstrong, Texas Ranger, U.S. Marshal (b. 1850)
 May 2
 Tancrède Auguste, Haitian general, 20th President of Haiti (b. 1856)
 Metropolitan Baselios Paulose I, Indian bishop (b. 1836)
 May 6 – Elena Guro, Russian painter and writer (b. 1877)
 May 8 – Louis Adolphus Duhring, American physician (b. 1845)
 May 16 – Louis Perrier, member of the Swiss Federal Council (b. 1849)
 May 19 – Gabriel Loppé, French painter and photographer (b. 1825)
 May 25 – Alfred Redl, Austrian military intelligence officer, double agent (honorable suicide) (b. 1864)

June 

 June 2 – Alfred Austin, English Poet Laureate (b. 1835)
 June 5 – Chris von der Ahe, German-born American brewer, baseball owner (b. 1851)
 June 8 – Emily Davison, English suffragette (b. 1872)
 June 22
 Ștefan Octavian Iosif, Romanian poet (b. 1875)
 Victorin-Hippolyte Jasset, French pioneer (b. 1862)
 June 23 
 Nicolás de Piérola, Peruvian politician, 2-time President of Peru (b. 1839)
 Sir Jonathan Hutchinson, English surgeon (b. 1828)
 June 28 – Manuel Ferraz de Campos Sales, Brazilian lawyer, politician and 4th President of Brazil (b. 1841)

July 

 
 July 1 – Emanuel M. Abrahams, American politician (b. 1866)
 July 3 – Horatio Nelson Young, American Civil War naval hero (b. 1845)
 July 5 – Prince Arisugawa Takehito (b. 1862)
 July 7 – Edward Burd Grubb Jr., American Union Army officer, diplomat and politician (b. 1841)
 July 10
 Mikoláš Aleš, Austro-Hungarian painter (b. 1835)
 John Valentine Ellis, Canadian journalist (b. 1835)
 July 11 – Charles Lavigne, Ceylonese Roman Catholic and Syro Malabar Catholic bishop and Servant of God (b. 1840)
 July 13 – Edward Burd Grubb Jr., American Civil War Union Brevet Brigadier General (b. 1841)
 July 16 – Sigismund Bachrich, Hungarian composer (b. 1841)
 July 17 – Esther Saville Allen, American author (b. 1837)
 July 19 – Clímaco Calderón, Colombian lawyer, politician and 15th President of Colombia (b. 1852)
 July 20 – Vsevolod Rudnev, Russian admiral (b. 1855)
 July 22 – Adhémar Esmein, French jurist (b. 1848)
 Eduardo López Rivas, Venezuelan editor and journalist (b. 1850)
 July 29 – Tobias Asser, Dutch jurist, recipient of the Nobel Peace Prize (b. 1838)
 July 30
 Lady Alicia Blackwood, English painter (b. 1818)
 Warren F. Daniell, American politician, U.S. Representative from New Hampshire (b. 1826)
 Itō Sachio, Japanese poet and novelist (b. 1864)

August 

 August 3
 Josephine Cochrane, American inventor of the first commercially successful dishwasher (b. 1839)
 Joseph Graybill, American actress (b. 1887)
 August 4 – Étienne Laspeyres, German economist (b. 1834)
 August 7 – Samuel Franklin Cody, American-born British aviation pioneer (b. 1867)
 August 9 – Wilhelm Albermann, German sculptor (b. 1835)
 August 10 – Jules Desbrochers des Loges, French entomologist (b. 1836)
 August 11 – Vasily Avseenko, Russian journalist and writer (b. 1842)
 August 13 – August Bebel, German Social Democratic politician (b. 1840)
 August 20 – Émile Ollivier, 24th Prime Minister of France (b. 1825)
 August 22 – Oscar de Négrier, French general (b. 1839)
 August 28 – Fyodor Kamensky, Russian sculptor (b. 1836)
 August 29 – Lars Havstad, Norwegian activist (b. 1851)

September 

 September 1 – Patriarch and Metropolitan Lukijan Bogdanović (b. 1867)
 September 9 – Paul de Smet de Naeyer, 16th Prime Minister of Belgium (b. 1843)
 September 13 – Arandzar, Armenian poet and writer (b. 1877)
 September 16 – Julius Lewkowitsch, German engineer (b. 1857)
 September 18 – Prince George Alexandrovich Yuryevsky (b. 1872)
 September 20 – Ferdinand Blumentritt, Filipino author (b. 1853)
 September 29 – Rudolf Diesel, German engine inventor (b. 1858)
 September 30
 Beatrice Bhadrayuvadi, Siamese princess (b. 1876)
 Antoni Klawiter, Polish Roman Catholic priest and venerable (b. 1836)

October 

 October 4
 Josep Tapiró Baró, Spanish painter (b. 1836)
 Faisal bin Turki, Sultan of Oman (b. 1864)
 Eleanor Cripps Kennedy, Canadian businessman (b. 1825)
 October 5 – Hans von Bartels, German painter (b. 1856)
 October 7 – Ivan Banjavčić, Croatian politician and philanthropist (b. 1843)
 October 10 
Adolphus Busch, German-American brewer, co-founder of Anheuser-Busch (b. 1839)
 Gregorio Maria Aguirre y Garcia, Spanish Roman Catholic cardinal (b. 1835)
 Katsura Tarō, 6th Prime Minister of Japan (b. 1848)
 October 12 – Elisabeth Leisinger, German soprano (b 1864)
 October 13 – Leonid Sobolev, 6th Prime Minister of Bulgaria (b. 1844)
 October 16 – Ralph Rose, American Olympic athlete (b. 1885)
 October 19 – Charles Tellier, French engineer, inventor of the chemical refrigerator (b. 1828)
 October 20 – Viktor Kirpichov, Russian engineer and physicist (b. 1845)
 October 21 – Theodor Kolde, German Protestant theologian (b. 1850)
 October 29 – Darío de Regoyos, Spanish painter (b. 1857)

November 

 November 3 – Sava Grujić, Serbian diplomat, general and politician, 5-time Prime Minister of Serbia (b. 1840)
 November 4 – Fredericus Anna Jentink, Dutch zoologist (b. 1844)
 November 7 – Alfred Russel Wallace, Welsh biologist (b. 1823)
 November 6 – Cho Ki-chon, North Korean poet (d. 1951)
 November 8 – Ferdinand Abell, American businessman (b. 1835)
 November 21 – Francesco Acri, Italian philosopher (b. 1834)
 November 25 – Haviland Le Mesurier, Australian soldier (b. 1856)

December 

 December 1
 Juho Lallukka, Finnish businessman (b. 1852)
 Juhan Liiv, Estonian poet and short story writer (b. 1864)
 December 5 – Ferdinand Dugué, French playwright (b. 1816)
 December 7
 Luigi Oreglia di Santo Stefano, Italian Catholic churchman, last surviving cardinal of Pius IX (b. 1828)
 Aaron Montgomery Ward, American businessman, inventor of mail order (b. 1844)
 December 8 – František Koláček, Austro-Hungarian physicist (b. 1851)
 December 10 – Léon Letort, French aviator (b. 1889)
 December 11 
 Abraham Hirsch, French architect (b. 1828)
 Carl von In der Maur, Governor of Liechtenstein (b. 1852)
 Ioan Kalinderu, Romanian jurist (b. 1840)
 December 12 – Menelik II, Emperor of Ethiopia (b. 1844)
 December 13 – Birger Kildal, Norwegian businessman (b. 1849)
 December 15 – Miguel Lebrija, Mexican aviator (b. 1887)
 December 19 – Patriarch Anthimus VII of Constantinople (b. 1827)
 December 25 – Alberto Aguilera, Spanish politician (b. 1842)
 December 26 – Ambrose Bierce, American writer, journalist (disappeared on this date) (b. 1842)
 December 27 – Infanta Antónia of Portugal (b. 1845)
 December 30 – Giovanni Maria Boccardo, Italian Roman Catholic priest and saint (b. 1848)

Nobel Prizes 

 Physics – Heike Kamerlingh Onnes
 Chemistry – Alfred Werner
 Medicine – Charles Richet
 Literature – Rabindranath Tagore
 Peace – Henri La Fontaine

References

Further reading
 Charles Emmerson. 1913: In Search of the World Before the Great War (2013) excerpt and text search; covers 20 major world cities
 Gilbert, Martin. A History of the Twentieth Century: Volume 1 1900-1933 (1997); global coverage of politics, diplomacy and warfare; pp 269–96.